Earl Fuller (March 6, 1904 – October 23, 1956) was an American middle-distance runner. He competed in the men's 800 metres at the 1928 Summer Olympics.

References

External links
 

1904 births
1956 deaths
Athletes (track and field) at the 1928 Summer Olympics
American male middle-distance runners
Olympic track and field athletes of the United States
Place of birth missing